Filip David (born 4 July 1940) is a Serbian writer and screenwriter, best known for penning essays, dramas, short stories and novels. In 2015, he won the NIN Award for best Serbian novel of the year 2014 for his novel "Kuća sećanja i zaborava" (The House of Remembering and Forgetting).

Biography
David was born in 1940 in Kragujevac to a Jewish family. He graduated from both the Faculty of Philology of the University of Belgrade and the Academy of Theater, Film, Radio and Television of the Belgrade University of Arts. He was a long-time editor of the drama program of the Radio Television of Belgrade. In 1989, he was one of the founders of the "Independent Writers" society in Sarajevo, in then-SFR Yugoslavia. He  was also the founder of the literary society "Belgrade Circle" in 1990. This society opposed the then-ruling government of Slobodan Milošević. In 1992, David was fired from the Radio Television of Belgrade for organizing an independent trade union.

The writer is signatory of the Declaration on the Common Language of the Croats, Serbs, Bosniaks and Montenegrins within the project Languages and Nationalisms. The declaration is against political separation of four Serbo-Croatian standard variants that leads to a series of negative social, cultural and political phenomena in which linguistic expression is enforced as a criterion of ethno-national affiliation and as a means of political loyalty in successor states of Yugoslavia.

Work
David has written several television dramas, dramas, books of essays, short story collections and novels.

Short story collections: 
"Bunar u tamnoj šumi" (English: "A Well in a Dark Forrest")
"Zapisi o stvarnom i nestvarnom" ("Notes of the real and the unreal")
"Princ vatre" ("Fire Prince")
"Sabrane i nove priče" ("Collected and New Stories")
Novels: 
"Hodočasnici neba i zemlje" ("Pilgrims of the Earth and the Sky")
"San o ljubavi i smrti" ("A Dream of Love and Death")
"Kuća sećanja i zaborava" ("The House of Memory and Oblivion", also translated as "The House of Remembering and Forgetting")
Books of essays:
"Fragmenti iz mračnih vremena" ("Fragments from Dark Times")
"Jesmo li čudovišta" ("Are We Monsters")
"Svetovi u haosu" ("Worlds in Chaos"'')

References

1940 births
Living people
Writers from Kragujevac
Serbian Jews
Serbian novelists
Serbian dramatists and playwrights
Serbian male short story writers
Signatories of the Declaration on the Common Language